Detransition, Baby is a 2021 novel by American author Torrey Peters. It is her debut novel and was published by Penguin Random House.  The novel was met with critical success and praise for crafting a tender exploration of gender, parenthood, love, and trans life.

Plot 
The main characters are Reese, a trans woman, PR executive, and former partner of Amy; Amy, who detransitioned to live as a man and became Ames; and Katrina, a biracial Chinese and Jewish cis woman who is Ames's boss and current lover. All three are in their thirties and live in Brooklyn. After the end of their relationship, Reese and Ames have been estranged because of Ames's decision to detransition three years ago. 

Katrina discovers that she is pregnant with Ames's child, though Ames mistakenly believed himself sterile because of his time on hormone replacement therapy. Ames reveals to Katrina that he spent six years living as a woman and still considers himself a woman, though navigating the world as a trans woman was ultimately too difficult. Thus, Ames doubts that he can fulfill the masculine role of a father to a child. Ames reconnects with Reese, who has long wanted to mother a child of her own, believing that the three of them could form an unconventional family to raise the baby together. Reese grapples with the same self-destructive patterns that soured her old relationship with Amy, including sex with married men and chasers, and eventually ends up in the hospital towards the last part of the book. Katrina attempts to adjust to a different understanding of gender but intends to get an abortion if she cannot be sure she will have a support system. The three question their identities, their relationships with each other, and if they could form a stable family.

The book is separated into sections that move in time from years before the conception of Katrina's child to weeks after conception and explore both the nature of Reese and Amy's relationship and the journey of developing Katrina, Reese, and Ames potential family dynamic.

Background
Peters has stated that the character of Ames is inspired by an experience she had in 2016, when she visited Mexico and wore a suit to pass as male and avoid questions from customs about her male passport. Peters reflected that the novel is written in the genre of a soap opera and that the novel's characters talk "how I talk with my friends." In 2021, Peters said that while she was writing the book in 2018, "I was just thinking about what was going to be funny for my friends and what was pertinent to our lives", and "I had the freedom to imagine trans people as just quotidian, boring, flawed people. I wasn't engaging with trans people as an embattled group."

The dedication for Detransition, Baby is addressed to "divorced cis women". Peters' reasoning for this is that "divorced cis women must start over at a point in adulthood when they're supposed to be established", which she compares to what trans women experience.

Detransition, Baby was one of the first novels written by an out trans person to be published by a big-five publishing house.

Reception
Detransition, Baby was nominated for the 2021 Women’s Prize for Fiction, making Peters the first openly trans woman nominated for the award. The longlisting of Peters was met with some controversy from those who did not consider her to be a woman. A letter argued that she is "male" and therefore should not be eligible for the prize. Its list of signatories included atheist writer Ophelia Benson and environmentalist Rebecca Lush, but as a rhetorical strategy the letter also included long-dead writers such as Emily Dickinson and Willa Cather. Authors including Melinda Salisbury, Joanne Harris, and Naoise Dolan—another nominee for the 2021 prize—condemned the letter and expressed their support for Peters. The organisers of the prize released a statement condemning the letter and defending the decision to nominate Peters' book.

In early 2021, a TV adaptation of Detransition, Baby was announced. Grey’s Anatomy writer-producers Joan Rater and Tony Phelan are the showrunners for the drama/comedy television adaptation.

References

Novels with transgender themes
American LGBT novels
2020s LGBT novels
2021 American novels
2021 debut novels
Novels set in the 2010s
Novels set in Brooklyn